"Miniature" is episode 110 of the American television anthology series The Twilight Zone. It originally aired on February 21, 1963 on CBS. The story centers on a man's obsession with a dollhouse whose figures seem to be alive.

Opening narration

Plot
Charley Parkes thinks he sees a figure in a museum dollhouse that comes alive. He returns to the museum numerous times and gazes into the dollhouse. He keeps coming back and sees the doll in the house become animated (portrayed by a human actress). A guard tells him that the doll is not mechanical, but merely carved from a single block of wood, but this does not dissuade Charley.

Charley gradually falls in love with the figure, a woman who is in an abusive relationship with a male figure in the dollhouse. There is also a female housekeeper in the dollhouse. Charley is committed to a psychiatric hospital because of his belief that the figures in the dollhouse are alive and because he smashes the glass case of the dollhouse in an attempt to rescue the doll from the abusive male doll. He eventually is "rehabilitated", after some resistance, by pretending to be disabused of the delusion, and is returned to the care of his mother.

On the evening of his return home, his mother, sister, brother-in-law and a friend of his sister (who is interested in dating him) plan to celebrate his release with him, but discover that he has snuck out of the house. They contact the psychiatrist who treated Charley in the hospital and surmise that he has returned to the museum and the dollhouse. At the museum, Charley reveals his feelings for the figure. He relates to her in certain aspects (the woman dealing with an abusive suitor and Charley dealing with his overbearing mother).

The family members, psychiatrist, and museum guards search the museum for Charley but find nothing. Except for one guard, who glances into the dollhouse and sees Charley, now a miniature figure, finally together with his love in the dollhouse, sharing a stereoscope. Smiling, the guard decides never to reveal what he has witnessed.

Closing narration

Re-airing
Because of a pending copyright lawsuit over an earlier script that had been submitted with essentially the same concept, this episode was not included in the syndication package for The Twilight Zone. It was re-aired in 1984 as part of The Twilight Zone Silver Anniversary Special. For this showing, the dollhouse scenes were colorized in an early public demonstration of the then-innovative colorization process.

Critical reception
This episode's sterling reputation derives primarily from Robert Duvall's performance as the lead character Charley. It has been described as "great acting" (TV.com).

Cast
Robert Duvall as Charley Parkes
Pert Kelton as Mrs. Parkes
Barbara Barrie as Myra
William Windom as Dr. Wallman
John McLiam as Museum Guard
Barney Phillips as Diemel
Claire Griswold as The Doll (Alice)
Lennie Weinrib as Buddy
Joan Chambers as Harriet Gunderson
Chet Stratton as Museum Guide
Nina Roman as The Maid
Richard Angarola as The Suitor
Sally Kellerman as Office Worker

References

External links

Transcript DB episode

1963 American television episodes
The Twilight Zone (1959 TV series season 4) episodes
Television shows written by Charles Beaumont